The Lansdowne Monument, also known as the Cherhill Monument, near Cherhill in Wiltshire, England, is a 38-metre (125 foot) stone obelisk erected in 1845 by the 3rd Marquis of Lansdowne to the designs of Sir Charles Barry to commemorate his ancestor, Sir William Petty.

The monument was designated as Grade II* listed  in 1986, and restored by the National Trust in 1990.

References

Monuments and memorials in Wiltshire
Obelisks in England
Buildings and structures completed in 1845
Grade II* listed buildings in Wiltshire
1845 in England
Charles Barry buildings
Grade II* listed monuments and memorials